= Pipariya Nag =

- village
- Location within India Location within Madhya Pradesh
- Coordinates: 23.53°N 77.82°E
- Country: India
- State: Madhya Pradesh

Population
  - Total: 175

Languages
  - Official: Hindi
- Vehicle registration: MP-

Pipariya Nag is a village 15 km away from Vidisha. It is in Vidisha district of Madhya Pradesh in India. It has population of 175 people. Of 175 people, 79 are males and 96 are female.
